White Nancy is a structure at the top of Kerridge Hill, overlooking Bollington, Cheshire, England. Since 1966 it has been recorded in the National Heritage List for England as a designated Grade II listed building. Its profile forms the logo for the town of Bollington.

History
White Nancy was built in 1817 by John Gaskell junior of North End Farm to commemorate the victory at the Battle of Waterloo.  John Gaskell was a member of the Gaskell family who lived nearby at Ingersley Hall.  It originally had an entrance to a single room which was furnished with stone benches and a central round stone table, but the entrance is now blocked. It has been described as a summer house or a folly. Locals supposedly told 1940s Army signallers working on Kerridge Hill that the landmark was named after the lead horse that had transported all materials for the building of White Nancy.

Description
The structure is circular in plan with its shape described as that of a sugar loaf, and is surmounted with a ball finial. It is built in sandstone rubble which has been rendered and painted. Stone paving has been laid around its base which is inscribed with the points of the compass.

Painting
Until at least 1925 the structure was unpainted.  It has been painted in a number of different colours over the years, most commonly in white. In 2005 vandals painted it partly in pink.  In March 2009 it was repainted in white with the ball finial in black.  In 2012 a Jubilee crown and the dates 1952–2012 were added to the north-west face and Olympic rings added to the south-east face. The green ring is in the form of a laurel wreath encircling a gold medal and the number 29 which was added later to mark Team GB's 29 gold medals. It has also been painted with a large red remembrance poppy and during the 1980s it was commonly painted at Christmas, decorated as a Christmas pudding or Father Christmas.

In 2015, in recognition of the reason for its construction, the structure was painted with a '200th Anniversary of the Battle of Waterloo' motif, and the silhouettes of soldiers in traditional military uniform from the time. In May 2016 it was returned to its traditional all white with a black finial.

In May 2017, by request of the mayor of Bollington, a bee symbol was painted onto the monument to express solidarity with the people of Manchester after the Manchester Arena bombing.

In March 2018 the face of Mark E. Smith of post-punk band the Fall was painted on White Nancy, together with the text “This Nation’s Saving Grace”. A Facebook group claimed responsibility.

Visitor attraction

White Nancy provides a focus on the ridge of Kerridge Hill and from it there are extensive views across the Cheshire Plain towards the mountains of North Wales to the west, the hills of Shropshire to the south and the Pennines to the north and east. White Nancy and the Kerridge ridge are part of the Gritstone Trail. The Peak District Boundary Walk also runs past the monument. 

White Nancy has been acclaimed and has featured in countdowns of the best British follies identified by The Telegraph and by Alan Titchmarsh.

See also

 Listed buildings in Rainow

References

Bollington
Buildings and structures in Cheshire
Grade II listed buildings in Cheshire
Tourist attractions in Cheshire
Folly buildings in England
Buildings and structures completed in 1817
Hills of Cheshire